Benno Stehkragen is a 1927 German silent film directed by Trude Santen and starring Margit Barnay, Bruno Arno and Käthe Haack.

The film's sets were designed by the art director Botho Hoefer.

Cast

References

Bibliography

External links

1927 films
Films of the Weimar Republic
German silent feature films
German black-and-white films
Films directed by Trude Santen
Films based on German novels